Juan Bautista Rivarola Matto (1933 – October 14, 1999) was a Paraguayan journalist, narrator, essayist and playwright who made a great contribution to the culture is spite of living in the times of the dictatorial government in Paraguay, time in which there was hardly any activity related to the literature.

Childhood and youth
He was born in Asunción, on November 12, 1933 in the time of the Chaco War. He was the son of Octaviano Rivarola Bogarín and his wife, Victorina Matto. He was member of a family of former settlers of Paraguay, very attached to the traditions of the country, which he loved immensely.

First steps
He was a student of Juan Pedro Escalada and studied in the Colegio Seminario de San Carlos (San Carlos's Seminary School). He was a member of the armed groups that fought against the dictatorial government of General Alfredo Stroessner in the 1960s.

He studied Law and Philosophy at the University of Buenos Aires and dedicated a great part of his life to scholarship, focusing in history.

Since childhood he was always involved in riots and revolutions. When he was 13 years old there was a civil war in 1947, in which he took part on behalf of the revolutionaries. Like many of his generation, he participated in the political activity of the country, and had to live in exile for more than two decades. He returned to Paraguay in 1979 and worked in journalism until he died in 1992.

Career
In 1979 he returned to Paraguay to stay and started working as a journalist for the Newspaper HOY. In 1980 he co-founded Ediciones NAPA (NAPA Editions) with Alvaro Ayala, the firm closed after four years due to the economic problems in the country. It published forty-two Paraguayan books, opening the gates for Paraguayan authors. He has also written articles and editorials for the Newspaper ABC Color, traveled on several occasions to Europe, where he studied and attended conferences.

Work
Some of his published work:

 De cuando Carai Rey jugó a las escondidas (When Carai Rey played hide and seek)
 Diagonal De Sangre (Diagonal of Blood), subtitled "The history and its alternatives in the War of Paraguay". This work tried to explore the socio-economical, ideological and political scenario in which the War against the Triple Alliance developed (1864–1870).
 San Lamuerte – 1986 (Saint Lamuerte)
 El Santo de Guatambú (The Saint of Guatambú)
 Yvypóra – 1970 (From Guaraní language the direct translation is ghost of the earth)
 La isla sin mar
 Bandera sobre las tumbas (Flags over the tombs)
 El Niño Santo (The child Saint)
 Vidas y muerte de Chirito Aldama (Lives and death of Chirito Aldama)
 La abuela del bosque (The grandmother of the forest)
 Yvypóra, Diagonal de

Awards
 San Lamuerte – 1986 was awarded with the Gabriel Casaccia Award.
 El Niño Santo won 1st Prize V Centenary in 1991.
 Vidas y Muerte de Chirito Aldama won 2nd Prize V Centenary in 1991.

The later two were awarded ten days after his death and published later in 1994.

Last years
He died in Asunción, on October 14, 1991.

References
  Biografías
   Arandura Editorial

External links
  Cuantolibro
 Biblioteca Virtual Miguel de Cervantes

1933 births
1999 deaths
People from Asunción
Paraguayan people of Italian descent
Revolutionary Febrerista Party politicians
Paraguayan activists
Paraguayan journalists
Male journalists
Paraguayan dramatists and playwrights
Paraguayan male writers
Male dramatists and playwrights
20th-century dramatists and playwrights
20th-century male writers
20th-century journalists